Sorkheh Rural District is a rural district (dehestan) in Fath Olmobin District, Shush County, Khuzestan Province, Iran. At the 2006 census, its population was 8,286, in 1,261 families.  The rural district has 23 villages.

References 

Rural Districts of Khuzestan Province
Shush County